Mandemar is a locality in the Southern Highlands of New South Wales, Australia, in Wingecarribee Shire. The village is situated east of the ghost town, Joadja and has its own NSW Rural Fire Service.

At the 2021 census, 64 residents were recorded.

References

Towns of the Southern Highlands (New South Wales)